Kwei-Armah is a Ga surname, which means "to find the way". Notable people with the surname include: 
 Ayi Kwei Armah, (b. 1939), a Ghanaian writer notable for works like Two Thousand Seasons and The Beautyful Ones Are Not Yet Born. 
 Kwame Kwei-Armah OBE (b. 1967 as Ian Roberts) a British actor and comedian

See also

References 

Compound surnames
Ghanaian surnames